Quintin Charles Devenish "Charlie" Lawson (born 17 September 1959) is an actor, from Northern Ireland, who is best known for playing Jim McDonald on the long-running ITV soap opera, Coronation Street.

Early life and education
Lawson was born in 1959 in Enniskillen, County Fermanagh, Northern Ireland, the son of a businessman. Raised in a Protestant family, he was educated at Campbell College, a grammar school in Belfast. He then trained as an actor at the Guildhall School of Music and Drama in London, where a classmate and good friend of his was fellow Enniskillen native Adrian Dunbar, whom Lawson has said was the first Catholic he had ever met.

Career
Lawson has appeared in three films and in at least twenty television productions. He was Jim McDonald (who is originally from Belfast) in the ITV television soap opera Coronation Street. He first appeared as Jim in 1989 and remained a regular character for the next 11 years, since which time his appearances have been few and far between.

His other television work includes appearing as Seamus Duffryn in the 1982 Yorkshire Television thriller miniseries Harry's Game (also known as Belfast Assassin), and as one of the main characters, Billy, in Mike Leigh's television film Four Days in July, both based on The Troubles in Northern Ireland. He played Trigg in the 1989 television film The Firm. He has also appeared in various other television series including Doctors (twenty-four episodes), Bread (eleven episodes), The Bill (three episodes) and Rosemary & Thyme (one episode).

In 2000, Lawson made a programme for ITV Granada, Passion for Peace, which followed him back to Northern Ireland and reported on the creation of the Tim Parry Johnathan Ball Peace Centre in Warrington.

In 2005, Lawson appeared in the TV documentary Titanic: Birth of a Legend.

In 2009, Lawson appeared alongside an eight-foot Frankfurter sausage in a German television commercial, advertising hot dogs. His overdubbed catchphrase in the commercial is Betrachten Sie die Größe meiner Wurst! (English: "Look at the size of my sausage!").

In 2010, Lawson revealed that he would be returning to Coronation Street for its fiftieth anniversary celebrations. He speculated that bosses may be planning to kill his character off, however, this never happened. He stayed until April 2011. Lawson then returned for a three-month stint on the soap between August and November 2014. His brief return coincided with the imprisonment of Peter Barlow (Chris Gascoyne) after he was wrongly accused of murdering Tina McIntyre.

In 2015, Lawson made a guest appearance in an episode of the Comedy Central sitcom Brotherhood as the father of the three main characters. He also appeared as Doctor Black in the 2016 BBC drama My Mother and Other Strangers.

Lawson returned to Coronation Street in September 2018 with his supposed long lost daughter from his relationship with Liz.

Personal life
Lawson has been married twice, and has a daughter, Laura, from his first marriage to Suzie, which ended in divorce in 1994. His second marriage was to the makeup artist Lesley Bond, who died in 2010 sometime after they separated. He lives in Belfast with his partner, Debbie Stanley, having previously lived with her in Chester, Cheshire, for a number of years.

Lawson is an Ulster loyalist. In a 2008 programme, he admitted to supporting the actions of loyalist paramilitaries during the Ulster Workers' strike in 1974.

On 8 October 2018, while portraying Inspector John Rebus in the play Rebus: Long Shadows in Edinburgh, Lawson suffered a minor stroke on stage, but recovered shortly afterwards. He was subsequently replaced in the role by Ron Donachie.

On 8 June 2022 he criticised England manager Gareth Southgate for allowing his players to take the knee in support of the Black Lives Matter movement before each match, branding Southgate a 'plonker' for doing so. He made the comments while being interviewed on British news channel GB News.

Notes

External links

1959 births
Male film actors from Northern Ireland
Living people
People from Enniskillen
Protestants from Northern Ireland
Male stage actors from Northern Ireland
Male soap opera actors from Northern Ireland
Male television actors from Northern Ireland
People educated at Campbell College
Alumni of the Guildhall School of Music and Drama